Reiner may refer to:
Reiner (crater), a crater on the Moon, named after Vincentio Reiner
Reiner Braun, a fictional character in the anime/manga series Attack on Titan

People with the given name Reiner
Reiner Knizia, a board game designer
Reiner Schöne (born 1942), German actor

People with the surname Reiner
Carl Reiner (1922–2020), American film director, screenwriter, actor and father of Rob Reiner
Charles Reiner (1884–1947), English cricketer
Daniel Reiner (born 1941), French politician
Franz Reiner (1912–?), Swiss sprint canoer
Fritz Reiner, early-20th-century Hungarian conductor
Grete Reiner (1885–1944), Czech-German magazine editor and writer
Herbert Reiner Jr., American diplomat
Ira Reiner, American lawyer and politician
Irving Reiner, American mathematician
Jared Reiner, American professional basketball player
Keani Reiner (1952–1994), Hawaiian surfer and sailor
Lucas Reiner (b. 1960), American painter, printmaker, photographer, filmmaker and son of Carl Reiner
Markus Reiner, engineer and scientist, one of the founders of rheology
Rob Reiner (b. 1947), American film director, screenwriter, actor and son of Carl Reiner
Robert Reiner (businessman) (1880–1960),  machinist, entrepreneur and businessman
Vincentio Reiner (Renieri, Reinieri), a 17th-century Italian astronomer and mathematician

See also
Rainer (disambiguation)
Rainier (disambiguation)
Rayner (disambiguation)
Raynor
Reiners, a surname
Reyner

English-language surnames